A camerata is a small chamber orchestra or choir, with up to 40 to 60 musicians.

Examples of music ensembles 
 Camerata Vox Lumini, a chamber music ensemble from Talca, Chile
 Camerata Bariloche, a chamber music ensemble in Argentina  
 Camerata Bern, a Swiss small and flexible chamber orchestra
 Camerata Chicago, an American chamber orchestra
 Camerata de' Bardi 
 Camerata Ireland, a chamber orchestra
 Kyiv Camerata, a Ukrainian orchestra
 Camerata Klaipėda, a Lithuanian chamber orchestra
 Camerata Mediolanense, an ensemble of musicians established in Milano, Italy
 Camerata Mediterranea, a French nonprofit organization and an international, intercultural institute of musical exchanges
 Camerata of London, an English modern-instrument chamber orchestra
 Camerata Salzburg, an Austrian chamber orchestra
 Camerata Trajectina, a Dutch early music ensemble
 Boston Camerata, an American early music ensemble
 Halifax Camerata Singers, a Canadian chamber choir
 Manchester Camerata, a British chamber orchestra
 Oslo Camerata, a Norwegian mostly classical string orchestra
 Polish Chamber Orchestra Camerata-Wroclaw, a professional orchestra
 Skipton Building Society Camerata, an English professional chamber orchestra
 Toronto Camerata, a Canadian chamber orchestra
 University of Pretoria Camerata, a choir at the University of Pretoria, South Africa
 Washington Men's Camerata
 
 Camerata New Jersey, a virtuosic classical music ensemble based in metropolitan NY area.

References 

Types of musical groups